Gysi is a surname of Swiss-German origin. Notable people with the surname include:
 Alfred Gysi (1865–1957), Swiss dentist
 Andrea Gysi (born 1957), German lawyer and former politician
 Barbara Gysi (born 1964), Swiss politician
 Gabriele Gysi (born 1946), German actress
 Gregor Gysi (born 1948), German politician, the Left Party, formerly SED, PDS
 Hans Gysi (born 1953), Swiss writer
 Klaus Gysi (1912–1999), Minister of Culture, German Democratic Republic
 Wädi Gysi (born 1959), Swiss ice hockey player
 Willy Gysi (1918–…), Swiss field handball player

See also
 Gisin (disambiguation) 
 Gysin (disambiguation)

References